The 1921 Texas Mines Miners football team was an American football team that represented the Texas School of Mines (now known as the University of Texas at El Paso) as an independent during the 1921 college football season.  In its first and only season under head coach Thomas C. Holliday, the team compiled a 1–4 record and was outscored by a total of 142 to 21.

Schedule

References

Texas Mines
UTEP Miners football seasons
Texas Mines Miners football